Glancy is a surname. Notable people with the surname include:

 Adam Scott Glancy, game designer
 Bertrand Glancy (1882–1953), Irish-born British colonial administrator
 Christopher Glancy (born 1960), Catholic bishop in Belize
 Daniel Glancy (born 1988), Irish professional tennis player
 Diane Glancy (born 1941), Cherokee poet, author and playwright
 Harry Glancy (1904–2002), American swimmer
 James Glancy (born 1982), British television presenter, conservationist and politician
 Jehu Glancy Jones (1811–1878), Ambassador of the United States
Lawrence Glancy, Scottish footballer
 Michael Glancy (1950–2020), American glass artist
 Tom Glancy (1894–1949), Scottish footballer

See also
 Glancey

Surnames
Surnames of British Isles origin
Surnames of English origin
Surnames of Irish origin
English-language surnames